A levada is an irrigation channel or aqueduct specific to the Portuguese Atlantic region of Madeira.

History
In Madeira, the levadas originated out of the necessity of bringing large amounts of water from the west and northwest of the island to the drier southeast, which is more conducive to habitation and agriculture, such as sugar cane production. They were used in the past also by women to wash clothes in areas where running water to homes was not available. Similar examples can still be found in Iberia, such as some Aqueducts in Spain. 

In the sixteenth century the Portuguese started building levadas to carry water to the agricultural regions. The most recent were made in the 1940s. Madeira is very mountainous, and building the levadas was often difficult. Many are cut into the sides of mountains, and it was also necessary to dig  of tunnels.

Levadas today
Today the levadas not only supply water to the southern parts of the island, they also provide hydroelectric power. Some provide easy and relaxing walks through beautiful countryside, but others are narrow, crumbling ledges where a slip could result in serious injury or death.

Along both parts there are long sections which may cause hikers to suffer vertigo; and several tunnels for which flashlights and helmets are essential. The  is a much easier walk. It is known as the  because acacias (commonly misnamed mimosas) are found all along the route.

See also
 Leat
 Flume

References

 
Buildings and structures in Madeira
Irrigation canals
Portuguese words and phrases